"Rise Like a Phoenix" is a pop song performed by Austrian singer Conchita Wurst, and the winner of the Eurovision Song Contest 2014. Selected to represent Austria at the Eurovision Song Contest in Denmark, its official release on 18 March 2014 was followed on 21 March by Conchita's first live TV performance of the song, on the ORF show Dancing Stars. "Rise Like a Phoenix" was Austria's second winning entry in the competition, their first being in 1966.

Background
Composer Ali Zuckowski had originally composed the song for another project, however, every major record label in Austria had refused to produce "Rise Like a Phoenix". Following a request from the Austrian Eurovision team about possible song contributions, Zuckowski immediately thought of suggesting "Rise Like a Phoenix", reasoning, "I knew that with this song still something great was going to happen". The song was entered into the ORF internal selection process and was ultimately chosen to represent the country.

Music video
A music video to accompany the release of "Rise Like a Phoenix" was first released onto YouTube on 18 March 2014 at a total length of three minutes and five seconds.

Release
The song was released by the ORF on 18 March 2014. The accompanying music video was premiered on YouTube on the same day, while the song was offered on the ORF website for download.

Critical reception
Stern gave the song a rating of four out of five. 1966 Austrian winner Udo Jürgens said the song was "a well-composed song with a beautiful musical bow", and as the lyrics suggest, "rises from the ashes".

Track listing

Charts

Weekly charts

Year-end charts

Certifications

Release history

See also
 Austria in the Eurovision Song Contest 2014

References

External links

 Text and translation of the song 
 

2014 singles
2014 songs
Conchita Wurst songs
Eurovision Song Contest winning songs
Eurovision songs of Austria
Eurovision songs of 2014
Articles containing video clips
Songs with lyrics by Charlie Mason (lyricist)
Number-one singles in Austria